An olympiad (Olympiás) is a period of four years, particularly those associated with the ancient and modern Olympic Games.

Although the ancient Olympics were established during Greece's Archaic Era, it was not until Hippias that a consistent list was established and not until Ephorus in the Hellenistic period that the first recorded Olympic contest was used as a calendar epoch. Ancient authors agreed that other Olympics had been held before the race won by Coroebus but disagreed on how many; the convention was established to place Coroebus's victory at a time equivalent to the summer of 776  in the Gregorian calendar and to treat it as Year 1 of Olympiad 1. Olympiad 2 began with the next games in the summer of 772 .

Thus, for N less than 195, Olympiad N is reckoned as starting in the year   and ending four years later. For N greater than or equal to 195, Olympiad N started in   and ended four years later. By extrapolation, the  year of the th Olympiad began roughly around 2 August .

In reference to the modern Olympics, their Olympiads are four year periods beginning on January 1 of the year of the Summer Games. Thus, the modern Olympiad I began 1 January 1896, Olympiad II began 1 January 1900, and so on. Olympiad XXXII began 1 January 2020. Because the Julian and Gregorian calendars go directly from 1  to  1, the cycle of modern Olympiads is ahead of the ancient cycle by one year.

Ancient Olympics 
Each olympiad started with the holding of the games, which originally began on the first or second full moon after the summer solstice. After the introduction of the Metonic cycle about 432 BC, the start of the games was determined slightly differently. Within each olympiad, time was reckoned by referring to its 1st, 2nd, 3rd, or 4th year. Ancient writers sometimes describe their Olympiads as lasting five years but do so by counting inclusively; in fact each comprised a four year period. For example, the first year of Olympiad 140 began in the summer of 220  and lasted until the middle of 219 . After the 2nd, 3rd, and 4th years of Olympiad 140, the games in the summer of 216  would begin the first year of Olympiad 141.

Historians 
The sophist Hippias was the first writer to compile a comprehensive list of the Olympic victors (olympioníkes). Although his Olympic Record (Olympionikō̂n Anagraphḗ) is now entirely lost, it apparently formed the basis of all later Olympic dating. By the time of Eratosthenes, his dating of Coroebus's victory to 776  had been generally accepted. The panhellenic nature of the games, their regular schedule, and the improved victor list allowed Greek historians to use the Olympiads as a way of reckoning time that did not depend on the various calendars of the city-states. (See e.g. the Attic calendar of the Athenians.) The first to do so consistently was Timaeus of Tauromenium in the third century . Nevertheless, since for events of the early history of the games the reckoning was used in retrospect, some of the dates given by later historian for events before the 5th century  are very unreliable. In the 2nd century, Phlegon of Tralles summarized the events of each Olympiad in a book called Olympiads; fragments survive in the work of the Byzantine writer Photius. Christian chroniclers continued to use this Greek system of dating as a way of synchronizing biblical events with Greek and Roman history. In the 3rd century, Sextus Julius Africanus compiled a list of Olympic victors up to 217 , and this list has been preserved in the Chronicle of Eusebius.

Examples of Ancient Olympiad dates 

 Early historians sometimes used the names of Olympic victors as a method of dating events to a specific year. For instance, Thucydides says in his account of the year 428 BC: "It was the Olympiad in which the Rhodian Dorieus gained his second victory."
 Dionysius of Halicarnassus dates the foundation of Rome to the first year of the seventh Olympiad, 752 & 751 . Since Rome was founded on April 21, which was in the last half of the ancient Olympic year, it would be 751  specifically. In Book 1 chapter 75 Dionysius states: "...Romulus, the first ruler of the city, began his reign in the first year of the seventh Olympiad, when Charops at Athens was in the first year of his ten-year term as archon."
 Diodorus Siculus dates the Persian invasion of Greece to 480 : "Calliades was archon in Athens, and the Romans made Spurius Cassius and Proculus Verginius Tricostus consuls, and the Eleians celebrated the Seventy-fifth Olympiad, that in which Astylus of Syracuse won the stadion. It was in this year that king Xerxes made his campaign against Greece."
 Jerome, in his Latin translation of the Chronicle of Eusebius, dates the birth of Jesus Christ to year 3 of Olympiad 194, the 42nd year of the reign of the emperor Augustus, which equates to the year 2 .

Anolympiad 
Though the games were held without interruption, on more than one occasion they were held by others than the Eleians. The Eleians declared such games Anolympiads (non-Olympics), but it is assumed the winners were nevertheless recorded.

End of the era 
During the 3rd century, records of the games are so scanty that historians are not certain whether after 261 they were still held every four years.  Some winners were recorded though, until the last Olympiad of  393. In 394, Roman Emperor Theodosius I outlawed the games at Olympia as pagan. Though it would have been possible to continue the reckoning by just counting four-year periods, by the middle of the 5th century reckoning by Olympiads had ceased.

Modern Olympics

Start and end 
The Summer Olympics are more correctly referred to as the Games of the Olympiad. The first poster to announce the games using this term was the one for the 1932 Summer Olympics, in Los Angeles, using the phrase: Call to the games of the Xth Olympiad.

The modern Olympiad is a period of four years: the first Olympiad started on 1 January 1896, and an Olympiad starts on 1 January of the years evenly divisible by four.

This means that the count of the Olympiads continues, even if Olympic Games are cancelled: For instance, the regular intervals would have meant (summer) Olympic Games should have occurred in 1940 and 1944, but both were cancelled due to World War II. 

Nonetheless, the count of the Olympiads continued: The 1936 Games were those of the XI Olympiad, while the next Summer Games were those of 1948, which were the Games of the XIV Olympiad. The current Olympiad is the XXXII of the modern era, which began on 1 January 2020.

Note, however, that the official numbering of the Winter Olympics does not count Olympiads, it counts only the Games themselves. 

For example, the first Winter Games, in 1924, are not designated as Winter Games of the VII Olympiad, but as the I Winter Olympic Games. (The first Winter Games were termed as "Olympic" in a later year.)

The 1936 Summer Games were the Games of the XI Olympiad. After the 1940 and 1944 Summer Games were canceled due to World War II, the Games resumed in 1948 as the Games of the XIV Olympiad. However, the 1936 Winter Games were the IV Winter Olympic Games, and on the resumption of the Winter Games in 1948, the event was designated the V Winter Olympic Games.

The 2020 Summer Games were the Games of the XXXII Olympiad. On 24 March 2020, due to the ongoing COVID-19 pandemic, it was postponed to 2021 rather than cancelled, and thus becoming the first postponement in the 124-year history of the Olympics.

Some media people have from time to time referred to a particular (e.g., the nth) Winter Olympics as "the Games of the nth Winter Olympiad", perhaps believing it to be the correct formal name for the Winter Games by analogy with that of the Summer Games. Indeed, at least one IOC-published article has applied this nomenclature as well. This analogy is sometimes extended further by media references to "Summer Olympiads". 

However, the IOC does not seem to make an official distinction between Olympiads for the summer and winter games, and such usage particularly for the Winter Olympics is not consistent with the numbering discussed above.

Quadrennium 
Some Olympic Committees often use the term quadrennium, which it claims refers to the same four-year period. However, it indicates these quadrennia in calendar years, starting with the first year after the Summer Olympics and ending with the year the next Olympics are held. This would suggest a more precise period of four years, but, for example, the 2001–2004 Quadrennium would then not be exactly the same period as the XXVII Olympiad, which was 2000–2003.

Cultural Olympiad 

A Cultural Olympiad is a concept protected by the International Olympic Committee and may be used only within the limits defined by an Organizing Committee for the Olympic Games. From one Games to the next, the scale of the Cultural Olympiad varies considerably, sometimes involving activity over the entire Olympiad and other times emphasizing specific periods within it. Baron Pierre de Coubertin established the principle of Olympic Art Competitions at a special congress in Paris in 1906, and the first official programme was presented during the 1912 Games in Stockholm. These competitions were also named the "Pentathlon of the Muses", as their purpose was to bring artists to present their work and compete for "art" medals across five categories: architecture, music, literature, sculpture and painting.

Nowadays, while there are no competitions as such, cultural and artistic practice is displayed via the Cultural Olympiad. The 2010 Winter Olympics in Vancouver presented the Cultural Olympiad Digital Edition. The 2012 Olympics included an extensive Cultural Olympiad with the London 2012 Festival in the host city, and events elsewhere including the World Shakespeare Festival produced by the RSC. The 2016 games' Cultural Olympiad was scaled back due to Brazil's recession; there was no published programme, with director Carla Camurati promising "secret" and "spontaneous" events such as flash mobs. Cultural events in time for the 2020 Summer Olympics in Tokyo were planned but subsequently cancelled due to pandemic restrictions in Japan and was replaced by an alternative virtual event instead.

Other uses 
The English term is still often used popularly to indicate the games themselves, a usage that is uncommon in ancient Greek (as an Olympiad is most often the time period between and including sets of games). It is also used to indicate international competitions other than physical sports. This includes international science olympiads, such as the International Geography Olympiad, International Mathematical Olympiad and the International Linguistics Olympiad and their associated national qualifying tests (e.g., the United States of America Mathematical Olympiad or the United Kingdom Linguistics Olympiad), and also events in mind-sports, such as the Science Olympiad, Mindsport Olympiad, Chess Olympiad, International History Olympiad and Computer Olympiad. In these cases Olympiad is used to indicate a regular event of international competition for top achieving participants; it does not necessarily indicate a four-year period.

In some languages, like Czech and Slovak, Olympiad is the correct term for the games.

The Olympiad (L'Olimpiade) is also the name of some 60 operas set in Ancient Greece.

Notes 
General

Specific

References

External links

Chris Bennett, The Olympiad System, on tyndalehouse.com
Valerie Vaughan, The Origin of the Olympics: Ancient Calendars and the Race Against Time (2002) on OneReed.com, an astrologically-oriented site.
Hellenic Month Established Per Athens, 

Ancient Olympic Games
Calendar eras
Olympic culture
Units of time